Polisportiva Alghero was an Italian association football club located in Alghero, Sardinia. Its colours were red and yellow.

In the 2007–08 season of Serie D, Alghero finished 4th in Girone G, qualifying it for the promotional play-offs.  As a playoff semi-finalist, the team won special promotion to Serie C2, now called Lega Pro Seconda Divisione, as one of the 5 top teams in the promotional play-offs.

In the Lega Pro Seconda Divisione 2008-09 season, the team finished tied with Montichiari for 13th position in Girone A, but avoided playing in the relegation play-offs by having the better head-to-head record.

Following bankruptcy in 2010, Alghero subsequently folded.

Honours
Eccellenza Sardinia: 2003–04

External links
 Official website 

Football clubs in Italy
Association football clubs established in 1945
Association football clubs disestablished in 2010
Football clubs in Sardinia
Serie C clubs
1945 establishments in Italy
2010 disestablishments in Italy
Alghero